A tree-topper or treetopper is a decorative ornament placed on the top (or "crown") of a Christmas tree. Tree-toppers can take any form, though the most common include a star (representing the Star of Bethlehem), finial, angel ("Christmas angel"), or fairy. Additional forms range from a paper rosette, ribbon bow, Father Christmas or Santa Claus, to a Christian cross, owl, white dove, spike, or sunburst.

Tree-toppers may be made of from a wide range of materials. Modern plastic tree-toppers are often electric and once connected with the tree's lights offer a gentle glow. Following World War II, various symbols of Christmastide, such as Santa Claus, were introduced as electrified tree-toppers.

Origin and use

Use of a Christmas angel as a tree-topper represents to some the angel Gabriel from the Nativity of Jesus:

Use of a star represents the Star of Bethlehem:

During the 1870s, in conjunction with the growing power of the British Empire, the Union Jack became another popular tree-topper.

Alternatives
Some Neo-pagan homes celebrate the winter solstice, which falls close to Christmas, by decorating an evergreen tree as a symbol of continuing life, but make an effort to decorate it with non-Christian symbols and often choose tree-toppers representing the sun.

Popular culture
Hans Christian Andersen's 1844 short story, "The Fir-Tree", describes the decoration of a Danish Christmas tree, including its topper:

The use of a tree-topper is also depicted in Christmas songs, with lines such as "Först en stjärna utav gull" and "So hang a shining star upon the highest bough".

Image gallery

See also
Christmas tree
Christmas ornament

References

External links

Christmas decorations
 Topper